Kevin Kelly (born 1952) is the founding executive editor of Wired magazine, and a former editor/publisher of the Whole Earth Review. He has also been a writer, photographer, conservationist, and student of Asian and digital culture.

Life
Kelly was born in Pennsylvania in 1952, and graduated from Westfield High School, Westfield, New Jersey, in 1970. Through his father, an executive for Time who used systems analysis in his work, Kelly developed an early interest in cybernetics. He attended the University of Rhode Island for one year, studying geology.

Kelly has traveled extensively, backpacking in Asia. While travelling in the Middle East, he had a conversion experience and became a born-again Christian.  He was raised Catholic.

He lives in Pacifica, California, a small coastal town just south of San Francisco. He is married to the biochemist Gia-Miin Fuh and has three children: Kaileen, Ting, and Tywen.  He regrets not having a fourth child.

Among Kelly's personal involvements is a campaign to make a full inventory of all living species on earth, an effort also known as the Linnaean enterprise. He is also sequencing his genome and co-organizes the Bay Area Quantified Self Meetup Group.

Career
Kelly began contributing freelance articles to CoEvolution Quarterly in 1980, while living in Athens, Georgia. Around this time he was also editing his own start-up magazine called Walking Journal, and working in an epidemiology laboratory to support himself.

He was hired in 1983 by Whole Earth founder Stewart Brand to edit some of the later editions of the Whole Earth Catalog, the Whole Earth Review, and Signal. With Brand, Kelly helped found the WELL, an influential virtual community. As director of the Point Foundation, he co-sponsored the first Hackers Conference in 1984.

In 1992, Kelly was hired by Louis Rossetto to serve as executive editor of Wired, which was launched in March 1993. He brought to the magazine the cybernetic social vision of the Whole Earth publications and their networked style of editorial work, while also recruiting writers and editors from the WELL. He stepped down as executive editor in 1999; his current job title at Wired is Senior Maverick. Partially due to his reputation as Wired's editor, he is noted as a participant in and an observer of cyberculture.

Kelly's writing has appeared in many other national and international publications such as The New York Times, The Economist, Time, Harper's Magazine, Science, Veneer Magazine, GQ, and Esquire. His photographs have appeared in Life and other American national magazines.

As well as serving as editor on many publications, Kelly has written many novels surrounding his interest in cybernetics and all things tech. He is known for coining the term "The Technium," the accumulation of all technologies and inventions as a working, living system. Much of his work revolves around technology as a "living organism." He even refers to "The Technium" as the seventh kingdom of nature, that is self-organizing and autonomous. Kelly's book-length publication, Out of Control: The New Biology of Machines, Social Systems, and the Economic World (1992), presents a view on the mechanisms of complex organization. The central theme of the book is that several fields of contemporary science and philosophy point in the same direction: intelligence is not organized in a centralized structure but much more like a bee-hive of small simple components. Kelly applies this view to bureaucratic organisations, intelligent computers, and to the human brain.

He helped found the All Species Foundation. He was a futurist adviser on the Steven Spielberg-directed movie Minority Report.

Kelly has a chapter giving advice in Tim Ferriss' book Tools of Titans.

Select works

Books
 Out of Control: The New Biology of Machines, Social Systems and the Economic World (Basic Books 1992, Fourth Estate, 1995)
 New Rules for the New Economy: 10 Radical Strategies for a Connected World (Penguin, 1999)
 "Photographers section: Kevin Kelly," pp. 106–111, in Lloyd Kahn, editor 2004 Home Work  (Shelter Publications, 2004)
 True Films (2006)
 "Forward: 1000 True Fans," pp. 3–8, in Be The Media, David Mathison, editor, (2009)
 What Technology Wants (2010)
 Cool Tools (2013) – Tool reviews collected from his weblog of the same name in large scale format similar to Whole Earth Catalog
 The Inevitable (2016)
 Vanishing Asia: Three Volume Set: West, Central and East  Photographs, text and design by Kevin Kelly (1084 pages) (2021)

Photography and art
 Asia Grace (2002)
 Bad Dreams (2003)
 Bicycle Haiku (1995)

Lectures
 Speculations on the Future of Science by Kevin Kelly. Lecture to Long Now Foundation, at Fort Mason in San Francisco. March 10, 2006.
 The Next Fifty Years of Science by Kevin Kelly. Google TechTalk, May 9, 2006. (47 minutes)
 How Technology Evolves by Kevin Kelly Talk at the TED Conference in Monterey, CA, February 2005. (21 minutes)
 The next 5000 days of the Web by Kevin Kelly Talk at the EG 2007 Conference in Monterey, CA, December 2007.
 Technium Unbound by Kevin Kelly SALT Talk for The Long Now Foundation. November 12, 2014.
 Cool Tools at XOXO by Kevin Kelly Talk at XOXO Festival 2014, Portland, OR.

References

Works cited

External links

 Kelly's personal site
 Kevin Kelly's Blog, The Technium
 "How Computer Nerds Describe God". Kevin Kelly. Christianity Today. Dec. 2002.
 Kelly's Vision of the Future of Cinema
 Audio Kevin Kelly has a revelation.
 All Species Inventory
 
 
 "How technology evolves" (TED2005)
 "The next 5,000 days of the web" (EG conference 2007)
 "Technology's epic story" (TEDxAmsterdam 2009)
 

1952 births
Living people
American male journalists
American non-fiction environmental writers
Businesspeople from the San Francisco Bay Area
People from Pacifica, California
People from Westfield, New Jersey
Whole Earth Catalog
Wired (magazine) people
Writers from the San Francisco Bay Area
Journalists from California
Activists from California
Futurologists
American futurologists
21st-century American non-fiction writers
Westfield High School (New Jersey) alumni
21st-century American male writers